Fry's or more commonly known as Frys, is a former Locality in Antler Rural Municipality No. 61, Saskatchewan, Canada. The hamlet is approximately 10 km east of the Town of Redvers along Highway 13 and the Canadian Pacific Railway line. Very little remains of the community of Fry's.

Fry's was named after James Henry Fry, the first postmaster (Jan 01 1901-Dec 7 1915) and Justice of the Peace. A Post Office was opened Jan 1, 1901 and closed July 7, 1961 located at Sec 14 Twp 7 Rge 31 W1.

See also

 List of communities in Saskatchewan
 Hamlets of Saskatchewan

References

https://web.archive.org/web/20140309083802/http://www.collectionscanada.gc.ca/databases/post-offices/001001-119.01-e.php?&isn_id_nbr=9820&interval=24&&PHPSESSID=ovku9vdounpmqi5cu7sbcsvf60

Antler No. 61, Saskatchewan
Unincorporated communities in Saskatchewan
Ghost towns in Saskatchewan
Division No. 1, Saskatchewan